Kate Duncan is an Australian music industry worker, best known for being the CEO of the Victorian youth music organization The Push Inc.

Career 
Duncan's early roles included stints within local government in Melbourne, working as a youth projects officer.

She started working with The Push Inc in 2016 as the organization's creative producer. In February 2018, Duncan was listed in theMusic.com.au's Power 50 at #44, and in May of the same year, Duncan was announced as the incoming CEO.

Following her recruitment as CEO, Duncan stated "I am completely honoured and super excited to have the opportunity to lead Victoria’s peak youth music organisation into its next chapter. After 30 years of incorporation, it is time for The Push to redefine our positioning as a relevant and dynamic organisation in fostering Victoria’s future generations of music industry leaders and audiences."

Awards and nominations

National Live Music Awards
The National Live Music Awards (NLMAs) are a broad recognition of Australia's diverse live industry, celebrating the success of the Australian live scene. The awards commenced in 2016.

|-
| National Live Music Awards of 2018
| Kate Duncan - The Push
| Victorian All Ages Achievement 
| 
|-

References 

Living people
1993 births
Australian women chief executives
Australian music industry executives
Businesspeople from Victoria (Australia)
Australian nonprofit businesspeople
Nonprofit chief executives